Chrysobalanaceae is a family of flowering plants, consisting of trees and shrubs in 27 genera and about 700 species of pantropical distribution with a centre of diversity in the Amazon. Some of the species contain silica in their bodies for rigidity and so the mesophyll often has sclerenchymatous idioblasts. The widespread species Chrysobalanus icaco produces a plum-like fruit and the plant is commonly known as the coco plum.

The family was traditionally placed as subfamily Chrysobalanoideae in the rose family (Rosaceae) or as a family in the rose order and exceptionally as an order in Myrtiflorae by Dahlgren In the phenotypic cladistic analysis of Nandi et al., it branched with Elaeagnaceae as sister group of Polygalaceae, in their molecular cladistic analysis it was in Malpighiales and also in their combined analysis.

Genera
, Plants of the World Online accepted the following genera:

Acioa Aubl.
Afrolicania Mildbr.
Angelesia Korth.
Atuna Raf.
Bafodeya Prance ex F.White
Chrysobalanus L.
Cordillera Sothers & Prance
Couepia Aubl.
Dactyladenia Welw.
Exellodendron Prance
Gaulettia Sothers & Prance
Geobalanus Small
Grangeria Comm. ex Juss.
Hirtella L.
Hunga Prance
Hymenopus (Benth.) Sothers & Prance
Kostermanthus Prance
Leptobalanus (Benth.) Sothers & Prance
Licania Aubl.
Magnistipula Engl.
Maranthes Blume
Microdesmia (Benth.) Sothers & Prance
Moquilea Aubl.
Neocarya (DC.) Prance ex F.White
Parastemon A.DC.
Parinari Aubl.
Parinariopsis (Huber) Sothers & Prance

References

F. Carnevale Neto et al.: Chrysobalanaceae: secondary metabolites, ethnopharmacology and pharmacological potential, "Phytochemistry Reviews" (online), 2012, .

 
Malpighiales families
Pantropical flora
Taxa named by Robert Brown (botanist, born 1773)